Peligrosa is a song of the Moroccan singer Lartiste and the Colombian singer Karol G, it was recorded in 2018 and was released in 31 January 2019 in YouTube, has of April 2020, the song has 27 million views.

Charts

References 

Spanish songs
Karol G songs
2019 songs
2019 singles
Songs written by Karol G